Gary Riley (born April 28, 1967) is a former child and teen American character actor with numerous film, made-for-TV films and television credits.

Film and television career
Riley played Charlie Hogan, one of his best-known roles, in the 1986 film Stand by Me, and also received notice for his portrayal of Dave Frazier in the 1987 comedy Summer School. He made notable appearances as a thief who steals money from Steve Martin's character's wallet in Planes, Trains, and Automobiles and as a naive metalhead customer whom Ken Kessler (portrayed by Judge Reinhold) cannot bear to rip off after discovering his girlfriend is pregnant in Ruthless People.  He also made guest appearances on such TV shows as Knots Landing, Growing Pains, a special hour-long episode of Amazing Stories directed by Steven Spielberg, and Airwolf. His last role was as a thug in Fear, with Mark Wahlberg.

In 1986 he auditioned for the roles of "Bill S. Preston Esquire" and Ted "Theodore" Logan in Bill & Ted's Excellent Adventure being one of the final picks along with Keanu Reeves, Alex Winter, Matt Adler, and Donovan Leitch. In 2020 his audition tapes which had never been released publicly were released exclusively by the Daily Mail.

Personal life
Riley grew up in Irvine, California, attended Newport Harbor High School, and did acting training at South Coast Repertory Young Conservatory Players.

As the 1980s came to a close, he spent much of his time following the Grateful Dead and later Phil Lesh and Friends.

In addition, Riley has been a frequent guest of the "Adventure Club Podcast" on ACPN, with hosts Guy Hutchinson and John J. Galbo. He will call in from different bars and restaurants with various guests in the entertainment industry. He participated in the Summer School Q&A at New Beverly Cinema in the summer of 2013.

Riley has said he lived off residual checks for almost twenty years after leaving Hollywood.

He has lived in Portland and Eugene, Oregon and currently resides in the Los Angeles area.

References

External links

1963 births
Living people
People from Irvine, California
American male film actors
American male television actors
Male actors from St. Louis
20th-century American male actors
Newport Harbor High School alumni